Sultan Thaha Syaifuddin Airport  (formerly WIPA) is an airport in Jambi City in the Jambi province of Indonesia. It is located in the Paalmerah suburb of Jambi. This airport is named after Sultan Thaha Syaifuddin, the last Sultan of Jambi (1816–1904).

History
In colonial times, Jambi Airport was built by the Dutch and Japanese by the name of Paalmerah Airport. The name comes from the peg Paalmerah made of stone to determine the location of the airport boundary that is attached by the Dutch and then given a name in red paint. In the 1950s after Indonesia proclaimed its independence, Jambi airport began to publicly airport by Departmental Agency of Civil Aviation. At that time the dimensions of the runway were 900m x 25m with construction of gravel, and the largest aircraft in operation is the Douglas DC-3.

Departmental Agency of Civil Aviation in 1970 changed the nomenclature to the Directorate General of Civil Aviation and Airports Paalmerah became Technical Implementation of the Directorate General of Civil Aviation in Jambi Province. In 1976, the construction of the runway extension into 1650m x 30m. Dated 10 October 1978, Paalmerah Airport renamed Jambi Sultan Thaha Airport is derived from the name of one local hero Jambi. In this year, carried out the installation of a Runway Visual Aid Light, VASI, CCR, REILS.

In mid-1978, the nomenclature changed Airports Jambi Sultan Thaha Sultan Thaha Airport into Jambi. 1991 saw the construction of a runway extension to 1800m x 30m. Approach in 1998, executed the installation of light and in 2000 again made a runway extension to 2000m x 30m. Along with technological development in 2005, carried VASI replacement and installation of PAPI.

On 1 January 2007, transfer of the Operational Management of Sultan Thaha Airport Jambi who Previously managed by the Technical Implementation Unit of the Department of Transportation and is now managed by PT Angkasa Pura II, while the largest that aircraft served the A320. Since managed by PT (Persero) Angkasa Pura II has been planned runway extension to 2220m x 30m and has been operated now.

Facilities

The runway was expanded to 2,400 meters long and 45 meters wide, which was implemented in 2012 (it would later  be expanded to 2,600 meters). This allows it to accommodate planes up to equivalent Boeing 757 from previous Boeing 737. An Instrument Landing System will also add to enable incoming aircraft make a perfect landing in bad weather.

On 12 December 2011, the groundbreaking of expansion terminal phase-1 has been done for capacity of 1.5 million passengers per year. Today, passengers has touched 1 million, while the capacity of the terminal is only 300,000 passengers per year. The terminal will be expanded from 2,308 square meter to 13,015 square meter. The new terminal was officially inaugurated on 27 December 2015. It is equipped with two jetbridge and can handle 1.8 million passengers per year. The president of Indonesia inaugurated the second phase of expansion on 21 July 2016. The expansion including 10 centimeter runway overlay and the terminal becomes 35,000 meter square. Nowadays the airport serves 23 takeoff and 23 landing and predicted can serve 35 takeoff and 35 landing per day.

The new terminals that can accommodate up to 1.6 million passengers per year, more than 2 times than the old terminal which can only accommodate up to 700,000 passengers per years. The new terminal was built with modern concepts along with the latest facilities such as air bridge, escalators, elevators, and also features a commercial area in the service and comfort of the passengers or air visitors. Moreover, PT Angkasa Pura II also featuring local wisdom in the new terminal through the display of local crafts ornaments as part of the interior of the terminal building. As part of efforts to promote tourism in Jambi, PT Angkasa Pura II (Persero) to place replicas of temple sites located in Muara Jambi, which is one of the largest temple complex in Southeast Asia. The new terminal area of 35 thousand square meters and parking area measuring 26,500 square meters with a capacity of 436 cars and 415 motorcycles. The cost of construction of a passenger terminal and parking facilities of Sultan Thaha Airport in accordance with a contract value is approximately Rp 126 billion. While the costs for the construction of the apron to Rp 110 billion, the tower construction and operation of buildings Rp 16 billion, as well as the construction of basic facilities and other supporting facilities is Rp 67 billion.

The Sultan Thaha Airport will be the first World's Zoo Airport in 2015, integrated with the Taman Rimba Zoo which only 900 meters from the new terminal. The airport will be set with animals nuances. Due to access road to airport takes a part of zoo land, the zoo will be 13 hectares only and according to Forestry Ministry Regulation, a zoo should be at least 15 hectares, and if less than the rule should be categorized as Taman Satwa (Animal Park).

Airlines and destinations

Passenger

Statistics

Accidents and incidents
 On 27 August 2008 a Sriwijaya Air Flight 62, a Boeing 737-200, overran the runway. There were eleven injuries and no fatalities initially, but later a farmer who was hit by the plane on the ground succumbed to his injuries.

References

External links
 

Jambi (city)
Airports in Sumatra
Buildings and structures in Jambi